The Scania Fencer is an integrally-constructed range of full-size buses produced by Scania and bodied by Higer Bus which was launched initially in the United Kingdom in 2021. The Fencer is planned to be offered in single deck (f1), double deck (f9) and articulated (f18) variants with options for diesel, hybrid, biogas and electric drivetrains.

Variants

Fencer f1
The single-decker Fencer f1 was the first of the Fencer range produced by Scania, with regular production of the Fencer f1 beginning in 2022; double-deck, tri-axle, articulated and coach variants have been confirmed to follow. Scania also plans to build the Fencer to Transport for London specification and are also considering allowing other bodybuilders to body the Fencer chassis.

A  diesel single-decker Fencer f1 was sold to PC Coaches of Lincoln in 2021, following use as a Scania demonstrator. A shorter  demonstrator for the United Kingdom market with a Scania DC07 engine, as well as a battery electric variant, are both expected to be delivered in late 2022.

Q-Park Heathrow Airport were the first operator in the United Kingdom to place an order for the Fencer f1, ordering eleven  Fencer f1s with DC07 engines on the new integral chassis, specified for airport bus services with air conditioning and luggage racking. The first two Fencers from this order entered service in November 2022.

Estonian bus operator GoBus were the first continental European operator to order the Fencer f1, taking delivery of 24 CNG-fuelled examples, four of which entered service in Harju County in December 2021 and the remaining 20 entering service in Narva in June 2022. 26 more Fencers have been ordered for delivery in 2022.

Fencer f6
In November 2021, Scania France took delivery of the first Fencer f6 school coach, built exclusively for use on French school bus networks with a capacity of up to 63 seats as well as four wheelchair spaces.

See also 

 Scania Citywide
 List of buses

References 

Single-deck buses
Low-floor buses
Coaches (bus)
Vehicles introduced in 2021
Fencer